Asides Besides is a compilation album by Talk Talk, released April 1998. It is a collection of rarities, B-sides and demos previously unavailable on CD. It was issued as a companion volume to the band's 1997 album remasters and has been described as "[tying] up loose ends" in the band's career. The album received positive reviews. The album only contains tracks from the 1982–1988 period, as EMI could only obtain rights for Talk Talk music from this period. An album of rarities for Talk Talk's career after 1988 was released in 2001 as Missing Pieces.

Background
Talk Talk released four studio albums on record label EMI in the 1980s, as well as numerous singles, an EMI-curated remix album (It's My Mix), and several EPs. Though the four studio albums were remastered onto CD in the 1980s (and again in 1997), the singles, remix album and EPs all contained B-sides and remixes that were not republished onto CD. A surge in Talk Talk's popularity arose following the 1997 aforementioned remasters of the band's catalogue, which was coupled with a new compilation album entitled The Very Best of Talk Talk, as well as new material from Mark Hollis and .O.rang. To capitalise on this, EMI decided to remaster and re-release all the previously unavailable songs on one double album.

Songs
Disc one consists solely of remixes, all of which had only been available on 12" singles and were not available on CD at that time. (New Talk Talk remixes had been released on the 1991 compilation album History Revisited which the band disowned and tried to block the release of.)

Disc two opens with rare demo versions of "Talk Talk" (already featured in its extended form on disc one), "Mirror Man" and "Candy," all of which had appeared on a limited edition double 7" single of "Such a Shame." The disc progresses into B-sides such as "John Cope," the B-side for "I Believe in You" from 1988. Single edits of songs such as "Eden" are also included. Disc two does feature one song that had already been available on CD: "My Foolish Friend," which had appeared on the 1990 retrospective album Natural History, but was not included in the 1997 CD remaster campaign.

"Call in the Night Boy (Piano Version)," "For What It's Worth," "It's Getting Late in the Evening" and "John Cope" later appeared on 2003's Introducing ... Talk Talk. All the remixes on disc one were reissued in 1999 as the standalone album 12 x 12 Original Remixes, which itself was reissued as Remixed in 2001.

Reception

Chris Woodstra of Allmusic found that the 12 inch single remixes which comprise the first disc are of only marginal interest, but that the obscure tracks featured on the second disc stand up well even against the band's contemporary album tracks. He summarized, "Asides Besides can certainly be seen as a cash-in release to coincide with Mark Hollis' first solo release and the reissue of Talk Talk's EMI catalog, but rarely does such a calculated industry move result in such a treat for fans ... Asides Besides may be of interest only to diehard Talk Talk fans, but for that audience this collection is absolutely essential."

In a rundown of Talk Talk's discography, the BBC said that Asides and Besides was "a double CD set that includes many of the band's best 12" mixes and b-sides.", though they criticized the sloppy scans of the sleeve artwork for the singles.

In 2014, the NME ranked the album at number 9 in their list of "30 Killer B-Side and Rarities Albums".

Track listing

Disc One
"Talk Talk" (Extended Version) – 4:35
"Today" (Extended Version) – 4:34
"My Foolish Friend" (Extended Version) – 5:30
"It's My Life" (Extended Version) – 6:19
"Such a Shame" (Extended Version) – 7:01
"Such a Shame" (Dub Mix) – 6:34
"Dum Dum Girl" (12" Mix) – 5:24
"Without You" (12" Mix) – 5:55
"Life's What You Make It" (Extended Mix) – 7:01
"Living in Another World" (Extended Remix) – 8:58
"Pictures of Bernadette" (Dance Mix) – 8:06
"Happiness Is Easy" (12" Mix) – 7:02

Disc Two
"Talk Talk" (Demo) – 3:28
"Mirror Man" (Demo) – 3:30
"Candy" (Demo) – 4:25
"Strike Up the Band" – 2:45
"?" – 4:09
"My Foolish Friend" – 3:20
"Call in the Night Boy" (Piano Version) – 3:50
"Why Is It So Hard?" – 4:05
"Again a Game ... Again" – 4:12
"Without You" – 3:26
"Dum Dum Girl" (US Mix) – 3:40
"It's Getting Late in the Evening" – 5:46
"For What It's Worth" – 5:22
"Pictures of Bernadette" – 5:04
"Eden" (Edit) – 4:22
"John Cope" – 4:39

References 

Talk Talk albums
1998 compilation albums
B-side compilation albums
Albums produced by Colin Thurston